Anilda Ibrahimi (born Vlorë, 30 April 1972) is an Albanian writer resident in Italy.

Ibrahimi was born in Albania and attended the University of Tirana. She left Albania in 1994 when she moved to Switzerland. In 1997 she moved to Rome, Italy, where she has been living since. Her first novel, Rosso come una sposa, was published in 2008. She has also published L'amore e gli stracci del tempo (2009),  Non c'è dolcezza (2012), and Il tuo nome è una promessa (2017).

She was the recipient of the Rapallo Carige Prize for Il tuo nome è una promessa in 2017. A graduate of the University of Tirana, she has lived in Rome since 1997.

References

Albanian women writers
Albanian women novelists
Albanian novelists
20th-century novelists
20th-century Albanian writers
20th-century Albanian women writers
21st-century novelists
21st-century Albanian writers
People from Vlorë
University of Tirana alumni
Albanian expatriates in Italy
1972 births
Living people
21st-century Albanian women writers